Lake trout (Salvelinus namaycush) is a species of char.

Lake trout or Lake Trout may also refer to:
Lacustrine (lake-dwelling) populations of other species, especially brown trout
Lake trout (seafood), fried Atlantic whiting
Lake Trout (band), an American rock band

See also
Salvelinus umbla, lake char
Trout Lake (disambiguation)